Svein Johannessen (17 October 1937 – 27 November 2007) was a Norwegian chess player. He became Norway's second International Master, after Olaf Barda, in 1961. He won four Norwegian Chess Championships, in 1959, 1962, 1970 and 1973.

According to ChessBase, Johannessen had a wide opening repertoire. He played most of the regular opening moves with White with some frequency, 1.d4, 1.e4, 1.c4 and 1.Nf3. With Black against 1.e4 he frequently entered the "open" games with 1...e5, but often played the Sicilian Defence as well. Against 1.d4 Johannessen also played several things including the Old Indian Defense and Queen's Gambit Accepted.

References
FIDE rating card for Svein Johannessen

List of Norwegian Chess Champions

Literature
Øystein Brekke: Sjakkmesteren Svein Johannessen, Norsk Sjakkforlag, Drammen 2009 

Norwegian chess players
Chess International Masters
1937 births
2007 deaths
20th-century chess players